Santa Eufemia is a municipality in Córdoba Province, Spain. According to the 2014 census, the municipality has a population of 893 inhabitants. Its postal code is 14491.

The town is located in Los Pedroches, in the Sierra Morena.

References

External links

Municipalities in the Province of Córdoba (Spain)